Archbishop Hoban High School is a Catholic college-preparatory school in Akron, Ohio. It is sponsored by the Catholic religious order Brothers of Holy Cross.

History
In the early 1950s, Archbishop Edward F. Hoban invited the Brothers of Holy Cross to staff a new high school in Akron to be named in his honor. Hoban is the third Holy Cross high school in the Diocese of Cleveland, along with Gilmour Academy in Gates Mills and St. Edward High School in Lakewood. In 1953, Archbishop Hoban High School opened.

In 1966 a group of students installed "The Big White Word", a set of hillside letters spelling "HOBAN", near the school along Interstate 80S (now Interstate 76).

Academics
In 1998, the U.S. Department of Education named Hoban a Blue Ribbon School of Excellence. Each year, Hoban students are recognized by the National Merit Scholarship Program.

Athletics

Ohio High School Athletic Association State Championships

 Baseball - 2021
 Boys Golf - 2020
 Football – 2015, 2016, 2017, 2018, 2020
 Boys Basketball – 2023
 Boys Track and Field – 1992, 1993
 Girls Basketball – 1988
 Girls Softball – 1983, 1984, 1986, 1987, 1991, 1992
 Girls Volleyball – 1980, 1990, 1991, 1992
 Girls Soccer – 2015

Ohio High School Boys Volleyball Association (OHSBVA)

 Boys Volleyball – 2008, 2010

Cocurricular achievements
 Mock Trial State Championships – 1994, 2006, 2011
 Mock Trial State Runner-Up – 2009

Notable alumni
 River Butcher, stand-up comedian
 Kyle Craven, Internet celebrity (Bad Luck Brian)
 James Harrison, football player for Pittsburgh Steelers, New England Patriots, attended 1 year
 LaTroy Lewis, outside linebacker for University of Tennessee, Houston Texans, Tennessee Titans
 John Neidert, former middle linebacker for University of Louisville, New York Jets, and Chicago Bears
 Clay Pickering, former NFL wide receiver
 Butch Reynolds, Olympic gold and silver medalist
 Nate Riles, retired Canadian Football League player
 Kenny Robinson, former baseball player for Toronto Blue Jays, Kansas City Royals
 Ric Sayre, marathoner and winner of the Los Angeles Marathon in 1986
 Tyrell Sutton, former professional football player for Northwestern University, Montreal Alouettes, Carolina Panthers, and Seattle Seahawks

References

External links
Official website
Student Newspaper
Hoban Theatre Series

High schools in Akron, Ohio
Catholic secondary schools in Ohio
Holy Cross secondary schools
Educational institutions established in 1953
1953 establishments in Ohio
Roman Catholic Diocese of Cleveland